The Uzbekistan Super Cup is a  one-match pre-season football competition held before the season begins in Uzbekistan every year. It is contested by the winners of the Uzbek League and the Uzbek Cup in the previous season.

History
The Uz-PFL Supercup was founded in 1999. The first edition of Cup was played in 1999 between Navbahor Namangan and Pakhtakor. This was the only played match until 2014. In January 2012 UzPFL announced that one match tournament recontested and would have been played on 11 March 2012 between Pakhtakor - Bunyodkor. On 7 March 2012 UzPFL informed that Supercup match canceled due JAR Stadiums poor ground conditions and rescheduled to be played later, but the match was not played. 

The second edition of Supercup was played on 7 March 2014, featuring Bunyodkor and Lokomotiv Tashkent. If the same team wins both Uzbek League and Uzbek Cup, then Uzbek Supercup is contested by the Uzbek League winner and the League runner-up. This has happened so far in 2014 (Bunyodkor).

Winners

Titles by team in Super Cup

Performance by representative

All-time top goalscorers

References

External links
UzPFL: Standings and Results

 
Super
Uzbekistan